The Markle–Pittock House is a historic house located in southwest Portland, Oregon listed on the National Register of Historic Places.

It was built as a Queen Anne style house during 1888-89 and was prominent as the largest house in Portland.  It was substantially modified in 1928 to Jacobethan Revival design by architects Jacobberger and Smith.

See also
 National Register of Historic Places listings in Southwest Portland, Oregon

References

External links
 

1889 establishments in Oregon
Houses completed in 1889
Houses on the National Register of Historic Places in Portland, Oregon
Queen Anne architecture in Oregon
Southwest Hills, Portland, Oregon
Tudor Revival architecture in Oregon